Qadirabad railway station is a disused railway station on the Karachi–Peshawar Railway Line located in Punjab, Pakistan. The station is located east of Yusafwala railway station and west of Okara Cantonment railway station.

See also
 List of railway stations in Pakistan
 Pakistan Railways

References

External links

Railway stations in Sahiwal District
Defunct railway stations in Pakistan
Railway stations on Karachi–Peshawar Line (ML 1)